The Sites Reservoir is a proposed $5.2-billion offstream reservoir project west of Colusa in the Sacramento Valley of northern California, to be built by the California Department of Water Resources.
Annual yield will depend on precipitation and environmental restrictions.

Construction is planned to begin in mid-2024, with final design expected to be done in 2025 and with operations targeted to begin by 2030.

The reservoir would be operated as part of the California State Water Project (SWP). Estimated economic benefits are around $260 million per year, with an operating cost of $10–20 million. In 2018, the state awarded $820 million from a bond (Proposition 1) to the reservoir project. About 30 water agencies in California have tentatively committed funding.

History 
The Sites Reservoir was proposed in the 1950s. California had serious droughts in 2006–2010 and 2011–2017, raising concern about water insecurity. The project is intended to improve reliability of supply during drought conditions.

Preliminary studies were conducted at a cost of $50 million during 1996–2014. The reservoir would be reduced in size if funding were cut back, but backers believe the project would still be built. Construction is scheduled to begin in 2024 and be completed in 2030. The California Water Commission voted in favor of the feasibility of the project in December 2021.

Cost and funding 
The estimated cost of the reservoir is $5.2 billion.

In 2018, the state awarded the reservoir project $820 million from a bond (Proposition 1), half the funding originally sought. Project backers were displeased with the funding shortfall. Additional funding was tentatively pledged from water agencies ("agricultural districts") in the Sacramento Valley, Fresno and urban agencies including Los Angeles. Each agency will be entitled to store water in the lake, in proportion to its share of the construction funding. In view of the shortfall, the pledges are being reassessed.

The high cost of storage has led irrigation districts in the Sacramento Valley to reduce their funding and share of ownership. Water agencies in southern California and the San Joaquin Valley have increased their share. Crops grown in the San Joaquin Valley, such as pistachios and almonds, have a higher value than typical crops in the Sacramento Valley. The San Joaquin Valley and urban agencies can afford to acquire higher-cost water. However, by state law, agencies in the Sacramento Valley control the entire governing board for the project.

The federal Bureau of Reclamation could put $1 billion into the project.

Approval of the project feasibility by the California Water Commission in December 2021 meant that the project stays eligible to receive more than $800 million in public funding.

Specifications 
The California State Water Project (SWP) would operate the project with an operating cost of $10–20 million. estimated economic benefits are around $260 million per year.

The  reservoir would be formed by several dams located in the east foothills of the California Coast Ranges, flooding the long and narrow Antelope Valley. The main dams, Sites and Golden Gate, would be built across Stone Corral and Funks Creeks, respectively. Six smaller saddle dikes would hold in the north end of the lake. Capacity could be expanded in the future, by raising the surrounding dikes.

Annual yield will depend on precipitation and environmental restrictions. The maximum inflow, will be carried by the existing Tehama-Colusa and Glenn-Colusa Canals and a new pumping station on the Sacramento River near Red Bluff.

The project would include a pumped-storage hydroelectric plant, similar to San Luis Reservoir in the San Joaquin Valley, and would be a net power consumer; however, it would be able to generate peaking power. It will provide large-scale grid energy storage.

Environmental impacts

The proposed reservoir is not located on a major river, but, as part of California water infrastructure, it would affect salmon fisheries by impounding water diverted from salmon-bearing watersheds, particularly the Trinity River via Lewiston Dam. Water pumped into the lake would be used to supplement flows into the delta or allow deeper, colder reservoirs to hold back water for critical salmon runs.

Diversions could take 60 percent of the Sacramento River's flow at times, potentially harming salmon and other fish. (The Sacramento River's flows include water allocated from the Trinity and other northern tributaries, despite harm to salmon runs in source watersheds.) The reservoir itself would affect habitat for 23 sensitive, threatened or endangered wildlife species.

According to "Final Feasibility Report" submitted by the Bureau of Reclamation in December 2020 : "A substantial portion of the project’s water would be specifically dedicated to environmental uses, helping to improve conditions for Delta smelt, preserving the cold-water pool in Lake Shasta to support salmon development, spawning and rearing, and providing a reliable water supply to improve the habitat for migratory birds and other native species." .

To protect fisheries, the pumping stations along the Sacramento River will have fish screens. There are potential modifications upstream at Shasta Dam that could increase the supply of cold water. The intakes at the Tehama-Colusa and Glenn-Colusa Canals will be modified.

State regulators announced environmental restrictions in 2018 that would limit river withdrawals to protect fish, but the state has not included strong protections in infrastructure plans. The water supply could fall short of projections.

See also
 Sites, California
 List of lakes in California
 Temperance Flat Dam
 Water in California

References

Proposed dams
Reservoirs in California